Beaufort is a commune and town in eastern Luxembourg. It is part of the canton of Echternach, which is part of the district of Grevenmacher.

Commune

In 2005, the town of Beaufort, which lies in the centre of the commune, had a population of 1,366. Other towns within the commune include Dillingen.

Population

Castle

The old castle, protected by a moat, was built in four periods. Based on a document of 1192, it is assumed that Walter of Wiltz and Beaufort was the first Lord of Beaufort.

The oldest part of the castle dates from the early 11th century. It was a small square-shaped fortress on a massive rock, surrounded by a wide ditch and a second wall facing the valley. Around the first half of the 12th century, a flanking tower was added and the access gate was moved and enlarged.

The marriage of Adelaide of Beaufort with William of Orley in 1348 meant that the castle became the property of the House of Orley. The lords of Orley expanded the castle towards the valley. The wing containing the well and the upper rooms as well as the lower part of the main tower date from this period. Since 1539 Bernard of Velbrück was Lord of Beaufort.

The House of Beaufort became ruined by the Thirty Year War and thus was forced to sell up. On 27.11.1639 Johann Baron von Beck, governor of the province of Luxembourg on behalf of the Spanish King, acquired the greatest part of its properties. It is likely that he built the wing with the large Renaissance style windows in the main tower and the northwestern cannon tower.  After 1643 he ordered the building of the new renaissance chateau. Johann von Beck, however, died of injuries received at the Battle of Lens in 1648 before he could even move in. His son finished the construction in 1649.

The old abandoned knights' castle slowly decayed. At the beginning of the 19th century it was used as a quarry. In 1850 the Luxembourg government declared the castle a cultural heritage.

As of 1893 Beaufort castle acquired a new look under the new owner Henri Even and his son Joseph Linckels. The new palace was restored and the sheep farm was expanded.

In 1928 Edmond Linckels cleared the rubble from the castle and the well and made the site available to the public. Since 1981 the castle and the chateau are owned by the Luxembourg state.

Gallery

References

External links

 
 
 Beaufort (at luxcentral.com)
 ADCLux Association of Luxembourg Castles

 
Communes in Echternach (canton)
Towns in Luxembourg